The 2012–13 Algerian Ligue Professionnelle 1 was the 51st season of the Algerian Ligue Professionnelle 1 since its establishment in 1962. A total of 16 teams contested the league, with ES Sétif as the defending champions. The league beain on September 8, 2012.

Team summaries

Promotion and relegation 
Teams promoted from 2011–12 Algerian Ligue Professionnelle 2
 CA Bordj Bou Arréridj
 USM Bel-Abbès
 JS Saoura

Teams relegated to 2012-13 Algerian Ligue Professionnelle 2
 AS Khroub
 NA Hussein Dey
 MC Saïda

Stadiums and locations

Personnel and kits 

Note: Flags indicate national team as has been defined under FIFA eligibility rules. Players may hold more than one non-FIFA nationality.

Managerial changes 

Managerial changes during the 2012–13 campaign.

Pre-season

During the season

League table

Leader week after week

The bottom of the table week after week

Season statistics

Top scorers

hattricks

See also 

 2012–13 Algerian Ligue Professionnelle 2
 2012–13 Algerian Cup

References

External links 
Soccerway

Algerian Ligue Professionnelle 1 seasons
Algeria
1